Luigi Giuseppe d'Ambrosio (November 8, 1913 – April 25, 1995), a.k.a. Lou Ambers, was an American World Lightweight boxing champion who fought from 1932 to 1941. Ambers fought many other boxing greats, such as Henry Armstrong and Tony Canzoneri.

Early life and career
Born Luigi Giuseppe d'Ambrosio on November 8, 1913 in Herkimer, Ambers started out in a large Italian family, struggling to find an identity.  Luigi took a ring name because he was afraid his Italian mother would find out that he was a fighter.

He defeated future world junior welterweight champion Johnny Jadick in a ten round unanimous decision on March 19, 1934, in Holyoke, Massachusetts.

Ambers defeated former world junior welterweight claimant Sammy Fuller on March 1, 1935 in a fifteen round unanimous decision at Madison Square Garden, New York City.  Before a crowd of 10,000, Ambers was stunned by a left from Fuller in the third round, but had his way with his opponent much of the remainder of the bout, taking an impressive thirteen of fifteen rounds.

Managed by Al Weill and trained by Charley Goldman, the "Herkimer Hurricane", began his career losing only once in more than three years.  He faced his greatest competitor, future hall of fame lightweight champion Tony Canzoneri on  May 10, 1935. Canzoneri defeated him over 15 rounds on a decision in Madison Square Garden, robbing Ambers of his first shot at the title. Canzoneri had Ambers down twice in round three.  A faithful crowd of 17,433 cheered as Canzoneri easily retook the title, knocking Ambers down again shortly before the closing bell.

Ambers did not let the defeat discourage him, winning his next 15 fights.

In one of his most difficult matches, Ambers defeated Fritzie Zivic on July 1, 1935, in a ten round unanimous decision in Millvale, Pennsylvania.  Ambers took the lead in the opening rounds, and had enough of a points margin to take the decision, but in the last two rounds he retreated often, his jaw being broken in the ninth by what appeared to be a right to the chin.  Zivic opened up with a right handed attack in the ninth and tenth that was simply not adequate to overcome the large points margin opened by his opponent.  Ambers was examined by a local hospital after the bout and released.

Before a crowd of 8,266, Ambers defeated the highly rated former junior lightweight champion Frankie Klick in a ten round points decision at Madison Square Garden on January 3, 1936.  Returning after his broken jaw only six months earlier, Ambers took some stiff shots to the chin in the sixth and seventh, but gained a significant points margin, winning eight of the ten rounds. In the seventh, Ambers put Klick to the canvas for a nine count as they broke from a clinch.  Ambers gained a points advantage quickly and his speed in the early rounds tired Klick, who was sapped of energy for a strong finish in the closing rounds.  The win improved Ambers' chances of getting a second shot at Canzoneri for the title.

Winning the lightweight championship, September 1936

He gained revenge when he captured the lightweight championship by decisioning Tony Canzoneri in 15 rounds on September 3, 1936.  As a former sparring partner of Canzoneri, he carried the fight to his opponent and mentor from the outset, turned back two spirited rallies, and won by a wide margin in a match that defined him as a boxer and competitor.  Adding an exclamation point, the Associated Press gave Ambers nine rounds, including the last three.

Ambers won a lightweight title bout against Pedro Montanez on September 23, 1937, before an exceptional crowd of around 32,000, in a fifteen round mixed decision at New York's Polo Grounds.  Though the referee voted for a draw, both judges scored the close bout in Amber's favor, with each voting he had won eight rounds.  The Associated Press gave Ambers a generous twelve rounds, with only one, the thirteenth, to Montanez.

Jimmy Garrison lost to Ambers in a ten round points decision of a non-title bout in Kansas City on May 11, 1938.  The United Press gave seven rounds to Ambers with only three to Garrison.

Loss of title to Henry Armstrong, August, 1938
On August 17, 1938 Ambers met Henry Armstrong in  an historic fight for the world lightweight title.  Armstrong was attempting to become the first fighter in history to win and hold three world titles simultaneously.  In a great fight, Ambers was knocked down twice, in the fifth and sixth rounds, and appeared badly beaten.    Ambers mounted a great comeback in the later half of the match, but lost the controversial split decision. Armstrong was penalized three rounds in the close bout for fouls.   Ambers lost the title for a year, until regaining it in a rematch one year later.

Frankie Wallace was one of Ambers' most frequent opponents.  Wallace fell to Ambers for the last time when he could not return to the ring for the sixth round on December 5, 1938, in Cleveland.  In a previous fight in the same city on December 6, 1937, Ambers won in a ten round unanimous decision on a large boxing ticket that featured a crowd of 12,000.  With a rapid left and effective right uppercut, Ambers gained a strong points margin, and had an ailing Wallace missing throughout the bout.  In their first meeting on April 27, 1933 in Utica, New York, Ambers took a six round points decision.

In their last meeting, Ambers achieved an eleventh round technical knockout of "Baby" Arizmendi on February 24, 1939 at New York's Madison Square Garden.  In a close bout that the Brooklyn Daily Eagle scored five rounds to Arizmendi and four to Ambers, the referee stopped the bout in the eleventh due to a gash on his opponent's right eyelid received in the ninth which made it difficult for him to continue.  The cut was opened again in the tenth with left uppercuts and examined by a Doctor at the end of the round, who ordered the referee to end the bout, which was officially called at the opening of the eleventh. It was the only knockout of Arizmendi's career.

Regaining lightweight title from Armstrong, August, 1939

Ambers' rematch with Henry Armstrong was as controversial as their first bout.  Armstrong was penalized for low blows, which enabled Ambers to capture the 15-round decision on August 22, 1939 before a crowd estimated at 30,000.  Penalized for low blows in the second, fifth, seventh, ninth, and eleventh rounds, Armstrong would have probably won the fight had it not been for his loss of points for fouls.  James Dawson of The New York Times wrote that "The title was not won on competition alone but on fighting rules and ethics...Armstrong was the victim of an injustice".      Demonstrating the closeness of the fight before accounting for Armstrong's fouls, the United Press scored the fight seven rounds for Ambers, with six for Armstrong, and two even.  Unlike their first meeting, Ambers remained on his feet throughout the bout, except for a single slip in one round. He used infighting consistently in the match, cutting and bruising Armstrong's face.  Many boxing reporters considered the match Ambers' last great performance.

Loss of world lightweight championship to Lou Jenkins, May, 1940

On May 10, 1940, Ambers defended his title against the wild, free swinging, Lew Jenkins.  Jenkins scored an upset when he knocked out the defending champion in the third round at Madison Square Garden.  Ambers was down for a count of five in the first and briefly in the second. He had to arise from another fall to the canvas at least once prior to the referee stopping the bout 1:29 into the third.

Ambers sought a rematch, and after a tune up win over Al "Bummy" Davis, he again faced Jenkins.  This time he suffered a technical knockout from Jenkins in the seventh round before 15,000 on February 28, 1941, at Madison Square Garden.  After a slow start, Ambers appeared game, taking tough blows from Jenkins in the third through the sixth, while still using his left effectively at times.  But in the seventh, Ambers was floored three times before the referee put an end to the fight, 2:26 into the seventh.

Life outside of boxing

After his last bout, Ambers wanted to continue with his career, but his manager, Al Weill, convinced him that he was through, and to retire.  Ambers never fought again.

Before his boxing retirement, he appeared as himself in a small role in MGM's The Crowd Roars (1938), a successful boxing movie starring Robert Taylor.

After his retirement from boxing, Ambers served in the Coast Guard in World War II.  He later operated a restaurant, and worked in public relations.   He died on April 25, 1995 in Phoenix, Arizona, and was interred at the Saint Francis Cemetery in Phoenix.  He and his wife Margaret Mary had a daughter and two sons.

Professional boxing record
All information in this section is derived from BoxRec, unless otherwise noted.

Official record

All newspaper decisions are officially regarded as “no decision” bouts and are not counted in the win/loss/draw column.

Unofficial record

Record with the inclusion of newspaper decisions in the win/loss/draw column.

See also
Lineal championship
List of lightweight boxing champions

References

External links

https://boxrec.com/media/index.php/National_Boxing_Association%27s_Quarterly_Ratings:_1940
https://boxrec.com/media/index.php/The_Ring_Magazine%27s_Annual_Ratings:_Lightweight--1930s
https://boxrec.com/media/index.php/The_Ring_Magazine%27s_Annual_Ratings:_Lightweight--1940s
https://titlehistories.com/boxing/na/usa/ny/nysac-l.html

1913 births
1995 deaths
American people of Italian descent
Boxers from New York (state)
Lightweight boxers
World lightweight boxing champions
International Boxing Hall of Fame inductees
American male boxers
United States Coast Guard personnel of World War II
People from Herkimer, New York